The Team free routine competition of the 2018 European Aquatics Championships was held on 3 and 4 August 2018.

Results
The preliminary round was held on 3 August at 09:00. The final was started on 4 August at 13:30.

Green denotes finalists

References

Team free routine